Moglia is a municipality in Italy.

Moglia can also refer to the following persons:

Joe Moglia (born 1949), an American businessman and former football coach
Luigi Moglia, a 19th century Italian mosaicist
Oscar Moglia (1935–1989), a Uruguayan basketball Olympian

See also
Mogila (disambiguation)